Deadman Creek may refer to:

 Deadman Creek (Owens River), a stream in California
 Deadman Creek (Snake River), a stream in the U.S. state of Washington